The Zebrzydowski (feminine form: Zebrzydowska, plural: Zebrzydowscy) was a Polish noble family.

History 
The family became important in the second half of the 16th and early 17th century in the First Republic of Poland. Grand Marshal of the Crown Mikołaj Zebrzydowski was one of the key people of the rokosz of 1606 against King Sigismund III Vasa, the so-called Zebrzydowski Rebellion.

Their family seat was Zebrzydowice, Lesser Poland Voivodeship.

Coat of arms
The coat of arms of the House of Zebrzydowski was Radwan.

Notable members

 Mikołaj Zebrzydowski z Sitna (died c. 1503), married Elżbieta Więcborska
 Wojciech Zebrzydowski z Więcborka (died c. 1525), starost of Żnin, married Elżbieta Krzycka z Krzycka h. Kotwicz
 Andrzej Zebrzydowski (1496–1560), Bishop of Kraków
 Bartłomiej Zebrzydowski (died before 1561), voivode of Inowrocław and Brześć Kujawski, married Countess Jadwiga Tęczyńska h. Topór 
 Kasper Zebrzydowski (died 1584), voivode of Kalisz and Royal rotmistrz, married Anna Jordan h. Trąby
 Andrzej Zebrzydowski z Więcborka (died c. 1595), castellan of Śremy, married Agnieszka Białośliwska h. Topór
 Kasper Zebrzydowski z Więcborka (died 1649), castellan of Kalisz, married Anna Daniłowicz h. Sas and Anna Dembińska z Dembian h. Rawicz
 Mikołaj Zebrzydowski (1494–1568), starost of Raciąż, married Anna Sampobolska h. Nałęcz
 Mikołaj Zebrzydowski (died before 1605), married Urszula Korzbok Zawadzka h. Korzbok
 Anna Zebrzydowska (died 1640), married Court Standard-Bearer of the Crown Sebastian Sobieski h. Janina
 Andrzej Zebrzydowski (died before 1615)
 Melchior Zebrzydowski (died after 1648), married Katarzyna Łaźniewska and Zofia Karniewska z Dłużniew
 Adam Zebrzydowski (died after 1646), married Anna Marchocka h. Ostoja
 Józef Bernard Zebrzydowski (1642–1710), canon of Kraków, Chancellor of Prince Jakub Ludwik Sobieski h. Janina
 Fabian Zebrzydowski, married NN Pisarzowska
 Jan Zebrzydowski (died before 1538), Royal rotmistrz, castellan of Oświęcim, married Felicja Przypkowska
 Florian Zebrzydowski (died 1562), Field Hetman of the Crown, married Zofia Dzik z Pieśni h. Doliwa 
 Mikołaj Zebrzydowski (1553–1620), Grand Marshal of the Crown and Hetman, married Dorota Herburt h. Herburt
 Jan Zebrzydowski (1583–1641), Miecznik of the Crown, starost of Lanckorona, married Barbara Lubomirska h. Szreniawa
 Michał Zebrzydowski (1613–1667), voivode of Kraków, the last male representative of the Zebrzydowski family, married Marianna Stadnicka ze Żmigrodu h. Szreniawa 
 Franciszek Florian Zebrzydowski (1615–1650), castellan of Lublin, married Anna Zofia Zenowicz h. Deszpot

See also
 City of Kalwaria Zebrzydowska, established in 1600 by Mikołaj Zebrzydowski

References

Bibliography
 Dworzaczek Włodzimierz, Genealogia, Warszawa 1959